The Marcus Wallenberg Prize is the highest award in the field of forestry.  Established in 1981, the award is modeled on the Nobel Prize, and colloquially called the "Nobel Prize for Forestry". The award is named after the Swedish Industrialist Marcus Wallenberg Jr. who was managing director and subsequently chairman of Stockholms Enskilda Bank and later chairman and honorary chairman of Skandinaviska Enskilda Banken, as well as chairman and honorary chairman of a number of Swedish and international organisations and companies. The Marcus Wallenberg Prize was instituted by Stora Kopparbergs Bergslags AB at its annual meeting in 1980 to commemorate the services rendered by Dr. Marcus Wallenberg during his long term as member and chairman of the board of directors. Every year a selection committee decides on the recipient from nominations received from academics and research organisations. The award is awarded in the autumn of each year in Stockholm, Sweden, at a symposium consisting of lectures from the recipient and invited speakers. The 2020 Award ceremony was postponed due to the COVID-19 pandemic.

Recipients

References

External links

Forestry
Awards established in 1981
1981 establishments in Sweden